Ruslan Sabirovich Khairov (born January 7, 1976, Kaspiysk, Dagestan) is a Russian-born former boxer from Azerbaijan. He competed in the Welterweight (– 69 kg) division, and won bronze medals at the 2003 World Amateur Boxing Championships and 2004 European Amateur Boxing Championships.

He competed at the Summer Olympics in 2000 and 2004, but was knocked out in the quarterfinals on both occasions, by Oleg Saitov of Russia in 2000 and Lorenzo Aragón of Cuba in 2004, both of whom proceeded to win gold and silver in their respective competitions. He retired from boxing in 2008. He currently resides in his hometown of Kaspiysk.

References

 Profile on Yahoo! Sports
 sports-reference

1976 births
Living people
Azerbaijani male boxers
Boxers at the 2000 Summer Olympics
Boxers at the 2004 Summer Olympics
Olympic boxers of Azerbaijan
Azerbaijani people of Lezgian descent
People from Kaspiysk
AIBA World Boxing Championships medalists
Welterweight boxers